The following lists events that happened in 2014 in Syria.

Incumbents
President: Bashar al-Assad
Prime Minister: Wael Nader al-Halqi

Events
For events related to the Civil War, see Timeline of the Syrian Civil War (January–July 2014) and Timeline of the Syrian Civil War (August–December 2014)

June
 June 3 - The presidential election takes place in government-controlled areas, amidst an opposition boycott. While the West denounces the election as rigged and "meaningless", delegations from President Bashar Assad's main supporters, including Russia, Iran and Venezuela, praise the election as transparent and free.
 June 4 - The Syrian government announces Assad was re-elected, claiming that Assad had won with 88.7% of the vote and a turnout of 73.47% of eligible voters.
 June 23 - The final stockpile of "declared" chemical weapons is shipped out of the country.

July
 July 16 - Assad is sworn in to serve his third seven-year term as President.

References

 
Syria
2010s in Syria
Years of the 21st century in Syria
Syria